Eliza Maria Gordon-Cumming Willoughby, Lady Middleton (16 June 1847 – 27 April 1922) was a British poet.   

Eliza Maria Gordon-Cumming was born on 16 June 1847, the daughter of Sir Alexander Penrose Gordon-Cumming, 3rd Baronet and Anne Pitcairn Campbell.  In 1869, she married Digby Wentworth Bayard Willoughby, the future 9th Baron Middleton. She died on 27 April 1922 in Birdsall House.

Bibliography 
 On the North Wind, Thistledown (1874)
 Ballads (1878)
 The story of Alastair Bhan Comyn; or, The tragedy of Dunphail; a tale of tradition and romance (1889)

References 

Created via preloaddraft
1847 births
1922 deaths
British women poets
Middleton
Daughters of baronets